Silence is a 1999 play by Moira Buffini, loosely based on the history of Dark Ages England but also drawing on New Millennium concerns at the time of its writing. It is set in Canterbury and Cumbria and on a journey between the two. It received its London premiere at the Arcola Theatre in August 2005.

Characters
Silence, Lord of Cumbria, a woman in disguise
Roger, a priest
Ethelred, King of England
Ymma, a princess from Normandy
Agnes, Ymma's servant
Eadric, Ethelred's bodyguard

References 

1999 plays
Plays by Moira Buffini
Plays set in the Middle Ages
Plays set in England